Ríos de Misericordia ("Rivers of Mercy"), also known as Niños Ríos de Misericordia ("Rivers of Mercy Children") is a Mexican Christian musical group composed of eight children from the children's shelter of the same name in Zacango, Acolman Municipality, State of Mexico. The group has released twenty studio albums since 2001.

Selected discography
 Mi vida y mi voz (Volume 1)
 Al Cordero gloria (Volume 2)
 Es por Tu gracia (Volume 9)
 Heme aquí (Volume 11)
 Tienen que saber (Volume 13)
 Amor tan Grande (Volume 15)

References

External links
 
 

Mexican musical groups
Child musical groups
Christian musical groups